Joseph Afful (born July 30, 1979, in Accra, Ghana) is a  soccer player, who plays for the Brooklyn Knights of the USL Premier Development League.

Career 
Afful came to the United States to play college soccer, first with St. Francis College where he was a three time All-Northeast Conference player from 2000 to 2003, and then an Atlantic Soccer Conference player in 2003 with Adelphi University. After college, Afful went on to play with the Atlanta Silverbacks after being released from the New England Revolution prior to joining the Knights in 2007.

Personal 
Afful has recently received an MBA degree from Adelphi University.

References

1979 births
Living people
Adelphi Panthers men's soccer players
Atlanta Silverbacks players
Brooklyn Knights players
Expatriate soccer players in the United States
Ghanaian expatriate footballers
Ghanaian footballers
Ghanaian expatriate sportspeople in the United States
Footballers from Accra
St. Francis College alumni
St. Francis Brooklyn Terriers men's soccer players
A-League (1995–2004) players
USL First Division players
USL League Two players
Association football forwards